The 2014–15 Hartford Hawks men's basketball team  represented the University of Hartford during the 2014–15 NCAA Division I men's basketball season. The Hawks, led by fifth year head coach John Gallagher, played their home games at the Chase Arena at Reich Family Pavilion and were members of the America East Conference. They finished the season 14–16, 7–9 in America East play to finish in fifth place. They lost in the quarterfinals of the America East tournament to New Hampshire.

Roster

Schedule

|-
!colspan=9 style=| Non-conference regular season

|-
!colspan=9 style=| America East Men's tournament

References

Hartford Hawks men's basketball seasons
Hartford
Hartford Hawks
Hartford Hawks